"Are You There?" is a song by American electronic music producer Josh Wink, released in March 1997.

Charts
The song did poorly in the UK Singles Chart, peaking at No.122. However, it gained success in the US Dance Chart, peaking at No.15

Personnel
Josh Wink - production, synths, samples, programming

References of sources

1997 songs